RevPAR, or revenue per available room, is a performance metric in the hotel industry that is calculated by dividing a hotel's total guestroom revenue by the room count and the number of days in the period being measured. However, if the calculation uses total hotel revenue instead of guestroom revenue it equals TRevPAR (Total Revenue Per Available Room). TRevPAR is another closely related performance metric in the hotel industry.

Since RevPAR is only a measurement for a point in time (say a day, or month or year) it is most often compared to the same time frame. It is often used in comparison to competitors within a custom defined market, trading area, or advertising region or a self-selected competitive set as defined by the hotel's owner or manager, which is referred to as RevPAR Index or RGI (Revenue Generating Index).  Also, comparisons are usually best considered between hotels of the same type, or with target customers. (e.g. full service, luxury, extended stay, economy)

A few syndicated data companies compile RevPAR information across markets via voluntary survey, and provide compiled blinded information back to the industry.  The STAR report is one such widely used report, and is provided by STR.

Other Caveats:
 Successful RevPAR numbers differ from market to market based on demand and other factors.
 Best compared across like time periods.  For example, it is proper to compare RevPAR on a Friday only versus other Fridays.  
 Best compared across similar seasonal time periods.  For example, comparing results from the Christmas week with the same a year previous is more credible than with a non-holiday week.

Calculation

 RevPAR is rooms revenue per available room (Total rooms inventory), 
 Rooms Revenue is the revenue generated by room sales
 Rooms Available as used in calculating

See also
 GOPPAR
 TRevPAR

References 

Pricing
Business intelligence terms
Supply chain management
Revenue
Hospitality management